Black Coal, Thin Ice is a 2014 Chinese thriller film written and directed by Diao Yinan, and produced by Vivian Qu. The film won the Golden Bear award at the 64th Berlin International Film Festival.

Plot

The following summary refers to the international version of the film, not the one released within China, which is 3 minutes and 40 seconds shorter, and does not include several scenes (e.g., the sex scene on the Ferris wheel, the final shot of the police and firefighters scaling the building) contained in the international version. It is debatable whether the Chinese version is censored or simply a different cut for a different audience. 

In Heilongjiang Province, 1999, the dismembered parts of a human body appear in shipments of coal in different cities. Detective Zhang Zili (Liao Fan) is assigned to investigate. The dead man is identified as a coal worker named Liang Zhijun, according to an identification badge next to some of the remains. Zhang and his partners (including Wang) go to interview a potential suspect and his brother. The suspect kills two of Zhang's partners before Zhang shoots the brothers while getting shot by one of them. Zhang survives. Wang and Zhang return the ashes of Liang to his widow Wu (Gwei Lun-mei), an employee at Rong Rong Laundry. Wu buries the ashes at the base of a tree just outside Rong Rong Laundry.

By 2004, Zhang has quit the police force and become a drunken security guard, having been traumatized by the prior events. During a chance encounter with Wang, Zhang learns that two additional murders have occurred by the same modus operandi. The common thread is that both of these men had dated Wu. Both men were wearing ice skates when they were killed. Zhang feels intrigued and begins to investigate. He becomes a customer of Rong Rong Laundry and tries to follow Wu at night, but she easily detects him. One day, the owner of the laundry (Wang Jingchun) explains to Zhang that he employs Wu out of sympathy, even though she does not do her job properly. In fact, five years before, Wu had damaged an expensive jacket and was unable to provide compensation, although a few days later the jacket's owner stopped complaining and disappeared.

Zhang tries to make friends with Wu, and eventually invites her to go ice-skating at an outdoor rink. Wang is secretly following the pair when he notices that a truck driver is also following them. He follows the truck driver, but while arresting him, the truck driver kills him using the blades of a pair of ice-skates as a weapon. The murder of his former partner makes Zhang even more determined. He follows up on a license plate number written on a pad of paper (presumably by Wang). While on the bus Zhang is followed by a man with a pair of skates. He goes into a restaurant and notices the man following him. He loses the man at a dance hall. The next day he follows the truck and sees the man dispose of wrapped packages from an overpass onto a passing coal train. He then follows the man to the outdoor ice skating rink. To test his new theory Zhang asks the service desk at the rink to page Liang Zhijun (the first murder victim from 1999). The man Zhang was following reacts by immediately leaving the rink.

The police confront Wu regarding the murders. She insists on speaking to Zhang. She tells him that Liang is alive and had killed someone during a robbery. She tells Zhang that Liang switched identities with the man and that Liang is alive and following her since 1999 and killing any man with whom she is involved.

Zhang gets Wu to help the police catch Liang. She reveals his location and arranges to meet him. They meet in a hotel and later go out to buy cigarettes. Liang notices the police and runs. Liang is armed with a gun, the police give chase and eventually kill Liang.

The police ask Wu for the ashes from 1999. She says that she threw the ashes in a river, which makes Zhang suspicious (he had seen her burying the ashes under a tree outside the laundry). He returns to the laundry and persuades the owner to sell him the damaged jacket that the customer had abandoned. After a search for the jacket's owner, Zhang arrives at the Daylight Fireworks Club. (The film's name in Chinese is "Daylight Fireworks".) He meets the owner of the club and asks if she recognizes the jacket. She says that her husband owned a similar jacket. She also says that in 1999 he left the club with another woman and she has not seen him since. Zhang asks the owner whether she would recognize the woman her husband left with, and she says yes. She offers to pay Zhang for the woman's whereabouts while appearing to fall into her bathtub fully clothed, indicating that she is possibly mentally unstable. Zhang says he only came to deliver the jacket.

Zhang goes back to the laundry to invite Wu to a performance at an amusement park. The next evening, on a Ferris wheel, Zhang asks Wu to look over the city. The neon lighting of the Daylight Fireworks Club is visible. Zhang asks Wu what she sees, and she admits seeing the club. Zhang wants Wu to tell him the truth before the police find out. Wu instead kisses Zhang and they end up having (awkward) sex while still on the Ferris wheel.

Police then question Wu and confront her with the jacket. Wu admits she killed the owner of the jacket. When she had not been able to afford to pay the value of the jacket, the owner of the jacket had forced her into an ongoing sexual relationship. Wu therefore killed the owner of the jacket. Wu said Liang had not been involved and that he had sacrificed everything for her, becoming a living dead person. She admits betraying Liang.

Zhang returns to his former life. Wu is arrested and the police walk her through the scene where the murder had taken place. When she is transported from the scene fireworks start going off, shot from a nearby rooftop. The daylight fireworks are an allusion to the Daylight Fireworks Club (and the title of the film). The film ends as police and firefighters scale the building to stop the person responsible for the fireworks.

Cast
 Liao Fan as Zhang Zili
 Gwei Lun-mei as Wu Zhizhen
 Wang Xuebing as Liang Zhijun
 Wang Jingchun as Rong Rong
 Yu Ailei as captain Wang
 Ni Jingyang as Su Lijuan

Production
The project started from Diao Yinan's idea to film a detective story. Diao spent eight years in total writing the screenplay; the final version that was filmed was the third draft. The film was then laid out into a detective film noir.

Liao Fan gained 44 pounds of weight to play the film's protagonist of an alcoholic and suspended police officer.

Name
The film's English title Black Coal, Thin Ice is different from its Chinese title Bai Ri Yan Huo, which translates literally as Daylight Fireworks. Diao Yinan came across this phrase from a friend of his. Diao further clarified the meaning of "daylight fireworks" as a state of sentiment or a state of condition. For him, the Chinese and English names together helped to construct the difference between reality and fantasy. In an interview he explained, "Coal and ice both belong to the realm of reality, but fireworks in daylight is something fantastic; they are the two sides of the same coin." The English name refers to the two visual clues in the film: coal as "where the body parts were found" and ice as "where the murder was committed". He further explained, "when the two are combined, the reality of this murder is constructed ... while daytime fireworks is a fantasy, it is what we use to coat ourselves from the cruel side of this real world."

Reception

Box office
Black Coal, Thin Ice grossed US$16.8 million worldwide.

Critical response
The film was shown in competition at the 64th Berlin International Film Festival, won the Golden Bear prize for Diao. The film's leading actor Liao Fan also won the Silver Bear for Best Actor. The film received critical praise at the Berlin Film Festival, but audience reaction was more divided.

On review aggregator website Rotten Tomatoes, the film has an approval rating of 96% based on 23 reviews, with an average rating of 7.82/10. On Metacritic, which assigns a normalized rating to reviews, the film has a weighted average score 75 out of 100, based on 5 critics, indicating "generally favorable reviews".

References

External links

2014 thriller films
2014 films
Chinese thriller films
Films directed by Diao Yinan
Golden Bear winners
Chinese neo-noir films